The Leeds City Council election took place on 2 May 2002 to elect members of City of Leeds Metropolitan Borough Council in West Yorkshire, England. Prior to the election, there had been several by-elections held with no change to the council composition. One third of the council was up for election and the Labour party stayed in overall control of the council.

Campaign
33 seats were contested in the election with Labour defending 23 seats, the Conservatives 5, Liberal Democrats 4 and 1 independent. Among the candidates who stood in the election was, Mark Collett, the leader of the youth wing of the British National Party, who stood in Harehills ward.

Among the issued raised in the election were disaffection with the national Labour government, a recent reversed decision by the council to close day car centres for the elderly, privatisation of services, investment levels in schools and council tax levels. Labour defended their record in control of the council, which they had run for the previous 22 years, in what was expected to be a hard-fought contest.

Election result
The results saw Labour maintain a majority on the council despite losing some seats to other parties. They lost 2 seats to the Conservatives in Aireborough and Otley and Wharfedale, 2 to the Liberal Democrats in Headingley and Rothwell, and one each to an Independent in Morley North and the Greens in Wortley. However Labour did gain one seat from the Liberal Democrats in Harehills and one in Hunslet from an Independent Socialist. As a result, they won 19 of the 33 seats contested meaning they had 57 of the 99 councillors on Leeds council. Overall turnout in the election was 30.64%.

This result had the following consequences for the total number of seats on the council after the elections:

Ward results

|- style="background-color:#F6F6F6"
! style="background-color: " |
| colspan="2"   | Labour gain from Independent Socialist
| align="right" | Swing
| align="right" | +3.8
|-

References

2002 English local elections
2002
2000s in Leeds